François Jeanneau (born June 15, 1935, Paris) is a French jazz saxophonist, flautist, and composer.

Jeanneau studied flute under René Leroy at the Paris Conservatory, but was an autodidact on saxophone. He began playing professionally in 1960 at the Club Saint Germain, then worked in the big band of Jef Gilson and in a sextet with François Tusques. In the late 1960s and early 1970s he was a member of the band Triangle (fr). He won the Prix Django Reinhardt in 1980 and was the first leader of the Orchestre National de Jazz in 1986.

Discography
 Triangle, Pathé 1970
 The Paris Quartet, François Jeanneau, Michel Graillier, J.-F. Jenny-Clark, Aldo Romano, Horo Records 1975
 Un Bien Curieuse Planète, 1975
 Techniques Douces, Owl Records 1976
 Ephémère, Owl Records 1977
 Akagera,  Daniel Humair, François Jeanneau, Henri Texier, Disques JMS 1980
 Double Messieurs,(Le Quatuor des saxophones), Open 1980
 Soli Solo Plus, 1981
 Mad Sax, (Le Quatuor des saxophones), Cy Records 1982
 Terraines Vagues (Pandémonium), 1983
 Prao, Cy Records 1983
 Orchestre National de Jazz , direction François Jeanneau, Label Bleu 1986
 Jazz Bühne Berlin (Orchestre National de Jazz), 1986 
 Pandémonium, Carlyne Music 1988
 Taxiway, 1989
 Mixtures: Music for Media, 1989
 Up Date 3.3 , Daniel Humair, François Jeanneau, Henri Texier, Label Bleu 1990
 Recontre, 1991
 Tribute to Mingus , Enrico Rava • François Jeanneau • Hervé Sellin • François Mechali • André Ceccarelli, Adda 1992
 Maloya Transit, le Quartet + le Trio Tambour, 1992
 A Love Affair in Cermont-Ferrand, 1993
 Chaude Image, 1995
 Le POM, 1997
 Alice, 1997
 Estremadure (Le POM), 1999
 Connection, 1999
 FrameWork, 2000
 Charméditerranéen (Orchestre National de Jazz), 2001–02
 Eleven, 2002
 Paf Paf mit Victor Komenkov, 2003
 Médéo (Youth Almaty Jazz Band), 2003
 Recontre avec Sulé, 2003
 Trans-Kasakh-Express, 2004
 Flench Wok, 2004
 Quand se Taisant les Oiseaux, 2006–07
 Art of the Duo: Walking in the Wind, François Jeanneau, Uli Lenz, Tutu Records 2008
 Tarot du Kebar with Emmanuel Tugny, Gwen Català éditeur, 2016

References

French jazz saxophonists
Male saxophonists
French jazz flautists
French male jazz musicians
Brotherhood of Breath members
Orchestre National de Jazz members
Label Bleu artists